Juan Verdugo may refer to:

 Juan Verdugo (Spanish footballer) (born 1949), Spanish football manager and former defender
 Juan Verdugo (Chilean footballer) (born 1949), Chilean football attacking midfielder